NGC 840 is a barred spiral galaxy in the constellation Cetus south of the ecliptic. It is estimated to be about 300 million light-years from the Milky Way and has a diameter of approximately 175,000 ly.

See also 
 List of NGC objects (1–1000)

References

External links 
 

Barred spiral galaxies
0840
Cetus (constellation)
008293